Peter Barton may refer to:
 Peter Barton (actor) (born 1956), American actor
 Peter Barton (cricketer) (born 1941), New Zealand cricketer
 Peter Barton (historian) (born 1955), British military historian
 Peter Barton (rugby league), rugby league footballer of the 1960s
 Peter Barton, Liberty Media president